The championship round of the 2013 World Baseball Classic was held at AT&T Park, San Francisco, California, United States from March 17 to 19, 2013.

The championship round was a single-elimination tournament. In the final (championship) game, the team with the higher winning percentage of games in the tournament were to be the home team. If the teams competing in the final had identical winning percentages in the tournament, then World Baseball Classic, Inc. (WBCI) would conduct a coin flip or draw to determine the home team.

The Dominican Republic defeated the Netherlands and Puerto Rico to win their first World Baseball Classic championship. Robinson Canó was named the tournament's Most Valuable Player.

Bracket

Note: "1R" = runner up in Pool 1.

Results
All times are Pacific Daylight Time (UTC−07:00).

Semifinal 1 − Puerto Rico 3, Japan 1

Two time World Baseball Classic defending champions Japan faces off against surprising upstart Puerto Rico in the first semi-final matchup. Puerto Rico scores a run from the first inning and scored two additional runs from a home run by Alex Ríos as the Japanese team struggle to catch up. Japan, however, only managed to score at least a run; Seiichi Uchikawa made a baserun snafu in an effort to steal second but was caught up between first and second bases as catcher Yadier Molina tags Uchikawa for a second out. Despite the efforts, Japan eventually loses to Puerto Rico 3-1 as their championship streak from two previous World Baseball Classic games has ended and the Japanese team gracefully bows out to the stands and the Puerto Rican baseball team after their defeat.

Semifinal 2 − Dominican Republic 4, Netherlands 1

Final − Dominican Republic 3, Puerto Rico 0

In the final, Samuel Deduno started for the Dominican Republic, while Giancarlo Alvarado started for Puerto Rico. 35,703 fans attended the game at AT&T Park in San Francisco. An additional 50,000 Dominican fans watched the game at Estadio Quisqueya in Santo Domingo, Dominican Republic. In Puerto Rico, the final was the most watched sporting event for the past year with nearly three-fourths of all households tuning in.

Edwin Encarnación hit a two-run double in the first inning, giving the Dominican Republic the lead. Erick Aybar had the game's third run batted in for the Dominican Republic. Deduno recorded five strikeouts in five scoreless innings pitched and Fernando Rodney completed the game with a save, his seventh save of the tournament.  Four Dominican relief pitchers combined for 4 scoreless innings.

This was the third time in the tournament that the Dominican Republic defeated Puerto Rico.  The Dominican Republic completed the tournament with an 8–0 record, becoming the first undefeated team to win the World Baseball Classic. Robinson Canó was named the Most Valuable Player of the Classic after he batted 15-for-32 (.469), the most hits in tournament history.  After the match the team was congratulated immediately for their victory by Dominican president Danilo Medina.

References

External links
Official website

Championship
World Baseball Classic championship
World Baseball Classic championship
Baseball competitions in San Francisco
International baseball competitions hosted by the United States
International sports competitions in California
World Baseball Classic championship